Fort Brooklyn was a British-built large star fort built to support the occupation of Brooklyn during the American Revolutionary War.

The site was on Brooklyn Heights, near present-day Pierrepont and Henry Streets, about four blocks from Fort Stirling. The fort was 450 feet square with ramparts 40 to 50 feet above the bottom of an encircling ditch.

Each angle had a bastion and there was a substantial barracks and two magazines. After the British evacuation the fort was leveled between 1823 and 1825 for development.

Sources
New York State Division of Military and Naval Affairs: Military History

1780 establishments in New York (state)
1823 disestablishments in New York (state)
Military installations established in 1780
Buildings and structures demolished in 1823
American Revolutionary War forts
Brooklyn
New York (state) in the American Revolution
Brooklyn
Brooklyn
18th century in Brooklyn
Brooklyn Heights
Demolished buildings and structures in Brooklyn